Dildar (13 January 1945 – 13 July 2003) was a Bangladeshi actor from the Chandpur district. He debuted in Bengali cinema in 1975 in the film  kano amon hoi . He was awarded Best Actor in a Comedy Role in 28th Bangladesh National Film Awards in 2003 for his role in the film Tumi Sudhu Aamar.

Filmography

References

External links
 

1945 births
2003 deaths
Bangladeshi male film actors
Bangladeshi comedians
20th-century comedians
Best Performance in a Comic Role National Film Award (Bangladesh) winners